Rajab Mwinyi (born January 10, 1984 in Bujumbura) is a Burundian midfield player who plays for Simba SC in Dar es Salaam. He is also a member of the Burundi national football team.

External links
 

1984 births
Living people
Burundian footballers
Association football midfielders
Young Africans S.C. players
Simba S.C. players
Expatriate footballers in Tanzania
Sportspeople from Bujumbura
Burundian expatriate footballers
Burundian expatriate sportspeople in Tanzania
Burundi international footballers
Tanzanian Premier League players